Palatine Church, also known as Palatine Evangelical Lutheran Church, is a historic Evangelical Lutheran church on Mohawk Turnpike in Palatine, Montgomery County, New York.  It was built in 1770 and is a small, rectangular, one story structure with massive stone walls.  It features a traditional meetinghouse plan.

It was added to the National Register of Historic Places in 1973.

References

External links

Lutheran churches in New York (state)
Churches on the National Register of Historic Places in New York (state)
Historic American Buildings Survey in New York (state)
Churches completed in 1770
Churches in Montgomery County, New York
Palatine German settlement in New York (state)
18th-century Lutheran churches in the United States
National Register of Historic Places in Montgomery County, New York
1770 establishments in the Province of New York